United Arab Airlines Flight 869 was an international scheduled passenger de Havilland Comet 4C flight from Tokyo, Japan, to Cairo via Hong Kong, Bangkok, Bombay and Bahrain. On 28 July 1963 it was being operated by a de Havilland Comet registered as SU-ALD, when on approach to Bombay's Santa Cruz Airport it crashed into the Arabian Sea off Bombay on 28 July 1963 with the loss of all 63 passengers and crew on board. Among the 55 passengers was the Philippine delegation of 24 Boy Scouts and adults traveling to the 11th World Scout Jamboree in Greece.

Accident
The crew requested an instrument landing system approach to runway 09 and that they would follow the back beam procedure. The controller advised them the procedure was not available and they should carry out an approach using the VOR beacon. The crew agreed to use the procedure and reported leaving  in the descent on the 272-degree radial from the VOR. The crew requested a left-hand procedure rather than the more normal right-hand one because of the weather. Permission was granted and the aircraft, already in severe turbulence, entered a left-hand turn and then crashed into the sea at 1:50 a.m.,  from Madh Island.

Probable cause
Because no wreckage was salvaged and the crew did not report any problems, it was concluded that the aircraft was probably lost due to loss of control while turning in severe turbulence and heavy rain.

Death of Boy Scouts of the Philippines Scouting Contingent

Boy Scouts of the Philippines scouts heading to the Jamboree that died in the Plane Crash.

From the Manila Boy Scout Council

Ramon V. Albano
Henry Chuatoco
Jose Antonio Delgado
Pedro Gandia
Wilfredo Santiago and
Ascario Tuason, Jr.

From the Quezon City Council

Roberto Castor
Romeo R. Rallos and
Rogelio Ybardolaza.

The remainder of the scouts

Victor de Guia, Jr. (Baguio City)
Antonio Limbaga (Zamboanga City)
Roberto Lozano (Dagupan City)
Paulo Madriñan (Pasay City)
Jose Fermin Magbanua (Negros Oriental)
Filamor Reyes (Cavite) 

Antonio Torillo (Cavite)
Benecio Tobias (Tarlac) and
Felix Fuentebella, Jr. (both Manila and Goa, Camarines Sur Councils)

BSP Scouters that died in the crash:

Scoutmaster and Physician, Bonifacio Vitan Lazcano, M.D.
Chaplain Fr. Jose Agcaoili Martinez, S.J.
Assistant Scoutmaster Librado L. S. Fernandez
Assistant Scoutmaster Florante Lirio Ojeda

These scouts are commemorated at both the 11th World Scout Jamboree Memorial Rotonda and the Colegio de San Juan de Letran monument shown above. In addition the streets around the Rotonda are named after the scouts and scouters who perished.

References

Bibliography

Aviation accidents and incidents in 1963
Accidents and incidents involving the de Havilland Comet
Aviation accidents and incidents in India
Airliner accidents and incidents with an unknown cause
869
1963 in India
July 1963 events in Asia